Romania competed at the 2000 Summer Paralympics in Sydney, Australia. 1 competitor from Romania won no medals to finish joint 69th in the medal table along with all other countries who failed to win medals.

See also 
 Romania at the Paralympics
 Romania at the 2000 Summer Olympics

References 

2000
2000 in Romanian sport
Nations at the 2000 Summer Paralympics